Antoine Fuqua (born May 30, 1965) is an American filmmaker, known for his work in the action and thriller genres. He was originally known as a director of music videos, and made his film debut in 1998 with The Replacement Killers. His critical breakthrough was the award-winning 2001 crime thriller Training Day.

His subsequent films include Tears of the Sun (2003), King Arthur (2004), Shooter (2007), Brooklyn's Finest (2009), Olympus Has Fallen (2013), The Equalizer (2014), Southpaw (2015), The Magnificent Seven (2016), The Equalizer 2 (2018), and Infinite (2021). He also directed the critically-acclaimed documentaries American Dream/American Knightmare (2018), What's My Name: Muhammad Ali (2019), and the 2022 Hulu documentary series Legacy: The True Story of the LA Lakers.

Early life
Fuqua was born in Pittsburgh, Pennsylvania, the son of Carlos and Mary Fuqua. He graduated from Taylor Allderdice High School in 1983. Before turning to filmmaking and music videos, Fuqua studied electrical engineering, with the hope of going on to fly jets in the military.

Fuqua pays tribute to screenwriter Shinobu Hashimoto, a frequent collaborator of Akira Kurosawa's, saying his writing "affected a boy from Pittsburgh living in the ghetto."

Fuqua explained how his experience of violence shaped his adolescence, and played a role in his eventual choice of career.

Career
Fuqua began his career directing music videos for popular artists such as Toni Braxton, Stevie Wonder, and Prince. He directed Michelle Pfeiffer in the video Gangsta's Paradise by Coolio which was used to promote Jerry Bruckheimer's successful film Dangerous Minds. 

From 1998 onwards, Fuqua began working primarily as a feature film director. In a tribute article for Time magazine, Fuqua expressed his early respect for Kurosawa as a filmmaker and how Kurosawa influenced his own perspective on filmmaking stating: "[screen writer Hashimoto's] ... working with Akira Kurosawa and Hideo Oguni, was so beautiful and poetic and powerful and heartbreaking. It was all about justice, it was all about sacrifice, and it made me want to be one of those guys".

His first feature films were the John Woo-produced action film The Replacement Killers (1998), starring Chow Yun Fat and the action comedy Bait (2000) starring Jamie Foxx. He then directed the crime thriller Training Day (2001), for which star Denzel Washington won an Academy Award for Best Actor. His next films were the action war drama Tears of the Sun (2003), the Arthurian legend film King Arthur (2004), the conspiracy action thriller Shooter (2007), the crime film Brooklyn's Finest (2009), and the action thrillers Olympus Has Fallen (2013) and The Equalizer (2014), the latter of which again pairs Fuqua with Denzel Washington. In 2011, he directed CIA procedural Fox pilot Exit Strategy starring Ethan Hawke.  He co-created the comic-book miniseries After Dark with Wesley Snipes, which was written by Peter Milligan and illustrated by Jeff Nentrup. He was slated to direct Tupac Shakur's official biopic but the project was postponed to allow Fuqua to direct rapper Eminem's second feature film, Southpaw (2015). Eminem later left Southpaw to focus on his music, and was replaced with Jake Gyllenhaal.

His 2016 film was a remake of the 1960 Western The Magnificent Seven which itself was an American remake of Kurosawa's 1954 film Seven Samurai. Denzel Washington plays the lead role of Sam Chisolm.

In early 2018, Fuqua worked as one of the executive producers on the Fox medical drama series The Resident. In the summer of 2018, his thriller sequel The Equalizer 2 (2018) was released with Denzel Washington returning in the main role. In June 2021, Fuqua's sci-fi film Infinite, starring Mark Wahlberg and Chiwetel Ejiofor was released.

In 2021, Fuqua and actor Will Smith announced that their upcoming film, Emancipation, will not be filmed in Georgia because of the recent passage of Georgia's restrictive voting law. Smith and Fuqua released the joint statement: "We cannot in good conscience provide economic support to a government that enacts regressive voting laws that are designed to restrict voter access".

On December 3, 2021, he signed a first look deal with Netflix and renamed his production company from Fuqua Films to Hill District Media. He later signed an overall television deal with Paramount Television Studios and MTV Entertainment Studios.

In January 2023, Fuqua announced his next film project would be Michael, a biographical film about Michael Jackson, starring Jackson's nephew Jaafar Jackson and being produced by Graham King.

Personal life 

Fuqua and actress Lela Rochon became engaged in 1998 and married on April 9, 1999. Daughter Asia Rochon Fuqua was born on July 28, 2002, and son Brando in May 2004. Fuqua has a son, Zachary, from a previous relationship. He also has two granddaughters.

When asked by the BBC in September 2014 whether he believes in God, Fuqua said: "Absolutely. I believe in God, absolutely."

Filmography

Film

Documentary films

Television

Executive producer only
 Shooter (2016–2018)
 Training Day (2017)
 The Resident (2018–present)
 FreeRayshawn (2020)
 Mayor of Kingstown (2021–present)

Music videos

Commercials
Pirelli Tires – "The Call" (2006), featuring Naomi Campbell and John Malkovich

References

External links

 Hollywood Reporter story on upcoming the Notorious B.I.G. film (from 2005)
 On Directing with Antoine Fuqua nthWORD Interview by Gina Ponce, April 2010
 Nicole Murphy Apologizes for Kissing Married Director Antoine Fuqua
 Nicole Murphy Apologizes to Antoine Fuqua's Wife After Kissing Pics Surface

1966 births
African-American film directors
Film directors from Pennsylvania
American music video directors
Living people
Businesspeople from Pittsburgh
Television commercial directors
Taylor Allderdice High School alumni
21st-century African-American people
20th-century African-American people
Action film directors